Julia is a high-level, general-purpose dynamic programming language. Its features are well suited for numerical analysis and computational science.

Distinctive aspects of Julia's design include a type system with parametric polymorphism in a dynamic programming language; with multiple dispatch as its core programming paradigm. Julia supports concurrent, (composable) parallel and distributed computing (with or without using MPI or the built-in corresponding to "OpenMP-style" threads), and direct calling of C and Fortran libraries without glue code. Julia uses a just-in-time (JIT) compiler that is referred to as "just-ahead-of-time" (JAOT) in the Julia community, as Julia compiles all code (by default) to machine code before running it.

Julia is garbage-collected, uses eager evaluation, and includes efficient libraries for floating-point calculations, linear algebra, random number generation, and regular expression matching. Many libraries are available, including some (e.g., for fast Fourier transforms) that were previously bundled with Julia and are now separate.

Several development tools support coding in Julia, such as integrated development environments (e.g. for Microsoft's Visual Studio Code, an extension is available providing debugging and linting support); with integrated tools, e.g. a profiler (and flame graph support available for the built-in one), debugger, and the Rebugger.jl package "supports repeated-execution debugging" and more.

Julia works with other languages, calling C has special support,  and with use of extra packages, e.g. for working with Python, R, Rust, C++, SQL and to work with or even to compile to JavaScript.

Julia can be compiled to binary executables using a package  for it supporting all Julia features. Small binary executables can also be made using a different package  but then the Julia runtime isn't included in the executable, e.g. down to  9 KB (then without e.g. the garbage collector since it's part of Julia's runtime, i.e. with similar limited capabilities to the C language), for computers or even microcontrollers with 2 KB of RAM. By default, Julia code depends on the Julia runtime to support all Julia features, e.g. threading, but some (non-idiomatic, to smaller or larger degree) Julia code can be compiled to small executables (with limited Julia capabilities). In both cases no source code needs to be distributed.

History
Work on Julia was started in 2009, by Jeff Bezanson, Stefan Karpinski, Viral B. Shah, and Alan Edelman, who set out to create a free language that was both high-level and fast. On 14 February 2012, the team launched a website with a blog post explaining the language's mission. In an interview with InfoWorld in April 2012, Karpinski said of the name "Julia": "There's no good reason, really. It just seemed like a pretty name." Bezanson said he chose the name on the recommendation of a friend, then years later wrote:

In the 10 years since the 2012 launch of pre-1.0 Julia, the community has grown. The Julia package ecosystem has over 11.8 million lines of code (including docs and tests). The JuliaCon academic conference for Julia users and developers has been held annually since 2014 with JuliaCon2020 welcoming over 28,900 unique viewers, and then JuliaCon2021 breaking all previous records (with more than 300 JuliaCon2021 presentations available for free on YouTube, up from 162 the year before), and 43,000 unique viewers during the conference.

Three of the Julia co-creators are the recipients of the 2019 James H. Wilkinson Prize for Numerical Software (awarded every four years) "for the creation of Julia, an innovative environment for the creation of high-performance tools that enable the analysis and solution of computational science problems." Also, Alan Edelman, professor of applied mathematics at MIT, has been selected to receive the 2019 IEEE Computer Society Sidney Fernbach Award "for outstanding breakthroughs in high-performance computing, linear algebra, and computational science and for contributions to the Julia programming language."

Both Julia 0.7 and version 1.0 were released on 8 August 2018. Work on Julia 0.7 was a "huge undertaking" (e.g., because of an "entirely new optimizer"), and some changes were made to semantics, e.g. the iteration interface was simplified; and the syntax changed a little (with the syntax now stable, and same for 1.x and 0.7).

Julia 1.1 was released in January 2019 with a new "exception stack" feature. Julia 1.2 was released in August 2019 with some built-in support for web browsers. Julia 1.3 added composable multi-threaded parallelism and a binary artifacts system for Julia packages. Julia 1.4 added syntax for generic array indexing to handle e.g. 0-based arrays. The memory model was also changed. Julia 1.5 released in August 2020 added record and replay debugging support, for Mozilla's rr tool.  The release changed the behavior in the REPL (soft scope) to the one used in Jupyter, but fully compatible with non-REPL code. Most of the thread API was marked as stable, and with this release "arbitrary immutable objects—regardless of whether they have fields that reference mutable objects or not—can now be stack allocated", reducing heap allocations, e.g. views are no longer allocating.  Julia 1.5 targeted so-called "time-to-first-plot" performance, in general, the speed of compilation itself (as opposed to performance of the generated code), and added tools for developers to improve package loading.

Julia 1.6 was the largest release since 1.0, is the latest/only long-term support (LTS) version (though most are adviced to use the latest stable/1.8 version), faster on many fronts, e.g. introduced parallel precompilation and faster loading of packages, in some cases "50x speedup in load times for large trees of binary artifacts".

As of version 1.7 Julia development is back to time-based releases.

Julia 1.7.0 was released in November 2021 with many changes, e.g. a new faster random-number generator. Julia 1.7.3 was released on 25 May 2022, fixing some issues, including at least one security update, and 1.7.x is no longer supported.

Julia 1.8 was released in 2022 (and versions up to 1.8.5 as a followup in January 2023, both fixing bugs (backporting) and "invalidations", thus compiling faster), with improvements for distributing Julia programs without source code,  and compiler speedup, in some cases by 25%,  and more controllable inlining (i.e. now also allowing applying @inline at the call site, not just on the function itself) and Julia 1.9 is the next milestone, it and the milestones for 1.10, 1.11, 1.12 and 2.0 currently have no set due dates.

JuliaCon
Since 2014, the Julia Community has hosted an annual Julia Conference focused on developers and users. The first JuliaCon took place in Chicago and kickstarted the annual occurrence of the conference. Since 2014, the conference has taken place across a number of locations including MIT and the University of Maryland, Baltimore. The event audience has grown from a few dozen people to over 28,900 unique attendees during JuliaCon 2020, which took place virtually. JuliaCon 2021 also took place virtually with keynote addresses from professors William Kahan (the primary architect of the IEEE 754 floating-point standard, which his keynote is about, that virtually all CPUs use and languages, including Julia), and Jan Vitek, Xiaoye Sherry Li, and Soumith Chintala (co-creator of PyTorch). JuliaCon grew to 43,000 unique attendees and more than 300 presentations (still freely accessible, plus for older years). JuliaCon 2022 will also be virtual held between July 27 and July 29, 2022, for the first time in several languages, not just in English.

Sponsors
The Julia language became a NumFOCUS fiscally sponsored project in 2014 in an effort to ensure the project's long-term sustainability. Jeremy Kepner at MIT Lincoln Laboratory was the founding sponsor of the Julia project in its early days. In addition, funds from the Gordon and Betty Moore Foundation, the Alfred P. Sloan Foundation, Intel, and agencies such as NSF, DARPA, NIH, NASA, and FAA have been essential to the development of Julia. Mozilla, the maker of Firefox web browser, with its research grants for H1 2019, sponsored "a member of the official Julia team" for the project "Bringing Julia to the Browser", meaning to Firefox  and other web browsers. The Julia language is also supported by individual donors on GitHub.

Julia company
JuliaHub, Inc. was founded in 2015 as Julia Computing, Inc. by Viral B. Shah, Deepak Vinchhi, Alan Edelman, Jeff Bezanson, Stefan Karpinski and Keno Fischer.

In June 2017, Julia Computing raised US$4.6million in seed funding from General Catalyst and Founder Collective, the same month was "granted $910,000 by the Alfred P. Sloan Foundation to support open-source Julia development, including $160,000 to promote diversity in the Julia community", and in December 2019 the company got $1.1million funding from the US government to "develop a neural component machine learning tool to reduce the total energy consumption of heating, ventilation, and air conditioning (HVAC) systems in buildings". In July 2021, Julia Computing announced they raised a $24 million Series A round led by Dorilton Ventures, which also owns  team Williams Racing, that partnered with Julia Computing. Williams' Commercial Director said: "Investing in companies building best-in-class cloud technology is a strategic focus for Dorilton and Julia's versatile platform, with revolutionary capabilities in simulation and modelling, is hugely relevant to our business. We look forward to embedding Julia Computing in the world's most technologically advanced sport".

Language features
Julia is a general-purpose programming language, while also originally designed for numerical/technical computing.
It is also useful for low-level systems programming, as a specification language, High-level Synthesis (HLS) tool (for hardware, e.g. FPGAs), and for web programming at both server and client side.

The main features of the language are:

 Multiple dispatch: providing ability to define function behavior across combinations of argument types
 Dynamic type system: types for documentation, optimization, and dispatch
 Performance approaching that of statically-typed languages like C
 A built-in package manager
 Lisp-like macros and other metaprogramming facilities
 Call C functions directly without wrappers or special APIs
 Ability to interface with other languages, e.g. PythonCall.jl allows calling to or from Python (also possible with PyCall.jl), R with RCall.jl, and Java/Scala with JavaCall.jl
 shell-like abilities to manage other processes
 Designed for parallel and distributed computing
 Coroutines: lightweight green threading
 User-defined types are as compact as built-ins
 Automatic generation of code for different argument types
 Extensible conversions and promotions for numeric and other types
 Support for Unicode, including but not limited to UTF-8

Multiple dispatch (also termed multimethods in Lisp) is a generalization of single dispatch the polymorphic mechanism used in common object-oriented programming (OOP) languages, such as Python, C++, Java, JavaScript, and Smalltalk that uses inheritance. In Julia, all concrete types are subtypes of abstract types, directly or indirectly subtypes of the Any type, which is the top of the type hierarchy. Concrete types can not themselves be subtyped the way they can in other languages; composition is used instead (see also inheritance vs subtyping).

By default, the Julia runtime must be pre-installed as user-provided source code is run. Alternatively, a standalone executable that needs no Julia source code can be built with e.g. PackageCompiler.jl.

In Julia everything is an object (e.g. the types that come with the language, including types, such as the machine integers and floats, which do not have lesser behavior like in many OOP languages, such as C++ and Java, and are still as fast as possible). However, unlike all the mainstream OOP languages, such as Python, the objects do not use single-dispatch (or inheritance), by default. And while that is idiomatic Julia code, more traditional OOP code can be opted into with the help of a package, emulating Python's single-dispatch OOP system. More (or most) styles of programming can be opted into, e.g. pattern matching, using packages.

Julia's syntactic macros (used for metaprogramming), like Lisp macros, are more powerful than text-substitution macros used in the preprocessor of some other languages such as C, because they work at the level of abstract syntax trees (ASTs). Julia's macro system is hygienic, but also supports deliberate capture when desired (like for anaphoric macros) using the esc construct.

Julia draws inspiration from various dialects of Lisp, including Scheme and Common Lisp, and it shares many features with Dylan, also a multiple-dispatch-oriented dynamic language (which features an ALGOL-like free-form infix syntax rather than a Lisp-like prefix syntax, while in Julia "everything" is an expression), and with Fortress, another numerical programming language (which features multiple dispatch and a sophisticated parametric type system). While Common Lisp Object System (CLOS) adds multiple dispatch to Common Lisp, not all functions are generic functions.

In Julia, Dylan, and Fortress, extensibility is the default, and the system's built-in functions are all generic and extensible. In Dylan, multiple dispatch is as fundamental as it is in Julia: all user-defined functions and even basic built-in operations like + are generic. Dylan's type system, however, does not fully support parametric types, which are more typical of the ML lineage of languages. By default, CLOS does not allow for dispatch on Common Lisp's parametric types; such extended dispatch semantics can only be added as an extension through the CLOS Metaobject Protocol. By convergent design, Fortress also features multiple dispatch on parametric types; unlike Julia, however, Fortress is statically rather than dynamically typed, with separate compiling and executing phases. The language features are summarized in the following table:

An example of the extensibility of Julia, the Unitful.jl package adds support for physical units of measurement to the language.

Interaction
The Julia official distribution includes an interactive command-line read–eval–print loop (REPL), with a searchable history, tab completion, and dedicated help and shell modes, which can be used to experiment and test code quickly. The following fragment represents a sample session example where strings are concatenated automatically by println:

julia> p(x) = 2x^2 + 1; f(x, y) = 1 + 2p(x)y
julia> println("Hello world!", " I'm on cloud ", f(0, 4), " as Julia supports recognizable syntax!")
Hello world! I'm on cloud 9 as Julia supports recognizable syntax!

The REPL gives user access to the system shell and to help mode, by pressing ; or ? after the prompt (preceding each command), respectively. It also keeps the history of commands, including between sessions. Code can be tested inside Julia's interactive session or saved into a file with a .jl extension and run from the command line by typing:

 $ julia <filename>

Julia uses UTF-8, e.g. for source code, meaning also allowing as an option common math symbols for many operators, such as ∈ for the in operator, typable with \in then pressing  (i.e. uses LaTeX codes, or also possible by simply copy-pasting, e.g.  possible for sqrt and cbrt functions). Julia has support for Unicode 14.0 (from 2021, and 1.9-rc1 supports the latest Unicode 15.0), for the languages of the world, even for source code, e.g. variable names (while not using English isn't recommended for code for others to read e.g. package names).

Julia is supported by Jupyter, an online interactive "notebooks" environment, and Pluto.jl, a "reactive notebook" (where notebooks are saved as pure Julia files), a possible replacement for the former kind. In addition Posit's (formerly RStudio Inc's) Quarto publishing system supports Julia, Python, R and Observable JavaScript (those languages have official support by the company, and can even be weaved together in the same notebook document, more languages are unofficially supported).

Use with other languages
Julia is in practice interoperable with other languages (e.g. majority of top 10–20 languages in popular use). Julia's ccall keyword is used to call shared library functions individually (such as for written in C or Fortran), and packages are available to allow calling other languages (which do not provide C-exported functions directly) e.g. Python (with PythonCall.jl), R, MATLAB, C# (and other .NET languages with DotNET.jl, from them with JdotNET), JavaScript, Java (and other JVM languages, such as Scala with JavaCall.jl). And packages for other languages allow to call to Julia, e.g. from Python, R, Rust, Ruby, or C#. Such as with juliacall (part of PythonCall.jl, pyjulia is a different option) to call from Python and a different JuliaCall package for from R. Julia has also been used for hardware, i.e. to compile to VHDL, as a High-level Synthesis (HLS) tool (for e.g. FPGAs).

Julia has packages supporting markup languages such as HTML (and also for HTTP), XML, JSON and BSON, and for databases (such as PostgreSQL, Mongo, Oracle, including for TimesTen, MySQL, SQLite, Microsoft SQL Server, Amazon Redshift, Vertica, ODBC) and web use in general.

Package system
Julia has a built-in package manager and includes a default registry system. Packages are most often distributed as source code hosted on GitHub, though alternatives can also be used just as well. Packages can also be installed as binaries, using artifacts. Julia's package manager is used to query and compile packages, as well as managing environments. Federated package registries are supported, allowing registries other than the official to be added locally.

Implementation
Julia's core is implemented in Julia and C, together with C++ for the LLVM dependency. The code parsing and code-lowering are currently implemented in FemtoLisp, a Scheme dialect. However, the FemtoLisp parser can be switched out at runtime with the pure-Julia package JuliaSyntax.jl, which improves speed and "greatly improves parser error messages in various cases," and will replace the FemtoLisp parser starting in version 1.10. The LLVM compiler infrastructure project is used as the back end for generating optimized machine code for all commonly-used platforms. With some exceptions, the standard library is implemented in Julia.

Current and future platforms
Julia has tier 1 macOS support, meaning for Intel-based Macs, but also for the new Apple M1-based Macs, by either running in Rosetta 2 emulation, or, while then, with tier 2 native (non-Rosetta) support with Julia 1.8 (unlike the older LTS version of Julia which only has tier 3 (experimental) support; Windows on ARM has no official support yet). The work on that support (i.e. without emulation) is mostly done, and many programs work with Julia 1.8.0. Julia was prior to 1.8.0 claimed to work "ok" on M1 Macs (at reduced performance) through the (automatic) use of Rosetta 2 (that needs to emulate Julia).

Julia has four support tiers. All IA-32 processors completely implementing the i686 subarchitecture are supported and all 64-bit x86-64 (aka amd64), i.e. all less than about a decade old are supported. ARMv8 (AArch64) processors are supported on second tier, and ARMv7 and ARMv6 (AArch32) are supported with some caveats (lower tier) for Julia 1.0.x and also had official executables for later versions, while 32-bit ARM support was later downgraded to tier 3 (however, unofficial binaries are available for Julia 1.5.1). Hundreds of packages are GPU-accelerated: CUDA (i.e. Nvidia GPUs; implementing PTX) has tier 1 support, with the help of an external package. There are also additionally packages supporting other accelerators, such as Google's TPUs, and some Intel (integrated) GPUs, through oneAPI.jl, and AMD's GPUs have support with e.g. OpenCL; and experimental support for the AMD ROCm stack. Julia's downloads page provides executables (and source) for all the officially supported platforms.

On some platforms, Julia may need to be compiled from source code (e.g., the original Raspberry Pi), with specific build options, which has been done and unofficial pre-built binaries (and build instructions) are available. Julia has been built 
for several ARM platforms, from small Raspberry Pis to (recent) top-1 supercomputer Fugaku's ARM-based A64FX. PowerPC (64-bit) has tier 3 support, meaning it "may or may not build".

Julia is now supported in Raspbian while support is better for newer Pis, e.g., those with ARMv7 or newer; the Julia support is promoted by the Raspberry Pi Foundation.

There is also support for web browsers/JavaScript through JSExpr.jl; and the alternative language of web browsers, WebAssembly, has minimal support for several upcoming external Julia projects.

Julia can compile to ARM; thus, in theory, Android apps can be made with the NDK, but for now Julia has been made to run under Android only indirectly, i.e. with a Ubuntu chroot on Android.

While Julia requires an operating system by default, and has no official support to run without or on embedded system platforms like Arduino, Julia code has still been run, with some limitations, on a baremetal 16 MHz 8-bit AVR-microcontroller Arduino with 2 KB RAM (plus 32 KB of flash memory).

Adoption
Julia has been adopted at many universities including MIT, Stanford, and UC Berkeley. Large private firms across many sectors have adopted the language including Amazon, IBM, JP Morgan AI Research, and ASML. Julia has also been used by government agencies including NASA and the FAA, as well as every US national energy laboratory.

Scientific and engineering computing
 Amazon uses Julia for quantum computing, or rather allows users with their Julia packages to run on the "state-of-the-art quantum hardware and simulators" Amazon provides and use all of the features (of Amazon Braket), e.g. superconducting, trapped ion, neutral-atom, and photonic quantum computers. The latest new device, QuEra's Aquila (at the time of the Julia package announcement) operates up to 256 qubits in analog mode. Amazon AWS also supports Julia (users) in other (non-quantum) ways, e.g. with Amazon SageMaker.
 ASML, the word's largest largest supplier of photolithography systems for the semiconductor industry (and Europe's largest tech company), uses Julia (did previously use MATLAB and C++, can replace with one language, Julia, both for research and for production), and does hard real-time work with their machines; has over 40 Julia packages,  most of which are which are private, while they've also open-sourced on their public Github.
 The Climate Modeling Alliance selected Julia for implementing their next generation global climate model to provide insight into the effects and challenges of climate change.
 CERN uses Julia to analyze data from the Large Hadron Collider (LHCb experiment).
 NASA and the Jet Propulsion Laboratory use Julia to model spacecraft separation dynamics, analyze TRAPPIST exoplanet datasets, and cosmic microwave background data from the Big Bang.
 The Brazilian INPE uses Julia to plan space missions and simulate satellites.
 Embedded hardware to plan and execute flight of autonomous U.S. Air Force Research Laboratory VTOL drones.

Pharmaceuticals and drug development
Julia is widely-used for drug development in the pharmaceutical industry, having been adopted by Moderna, Pfizer, AstraZeneca, Procter & Gamble, and United Therapeutics.

Other notable uses
 The Federal Reserve Bank of New York builds macroeconomic models in Julia in 2015 (ported from MATLAB), and for estimating COVID-19 shocks in 2021
 BlackRock, the world's largest asset manager, for financial time-series analysis
 Aviva, the UK's largest general insurer, for actuarial calculations
 Mitre Corporation, for verification of published election results
 Nobel laureate Thomas J. Sargent, for macroeconometric modeling

See also
 Comparison of numerical-analysis software
 Comparison of statistical packages
 Differentiable programming
 JuMP  an algebraic modeling language for mathematical optimization embedded in Julia

Notes

References

Further reading
 
 
 
 Tobin A Driscoll and Richard J. Braun (Aug. 2022). "Fundamentals of Numerical Computation: Julia Edition". SIAM. .
 C. T. Kelley (2022). "Solving Nonlinear Equations with Iterative Methods: Solvers and Examples in Julia", SIAM. .
 
 Clemens Heitzinger (2022): "Algorithms with Julia", Springer, ISBN 978-3-031-16559-7.

External links

 
 

2012 software
Array programming languages
Articles with example Julia code
Notebook interface
Cross-platform software
Data mining and machine learning software
Data-centric programming languages
Dynamically typed programming languages
Free compilers and interpreters
Free computer libraries
Free data analysis software
Free data visualization software
Free software programmed in C
Free software programmed in Julia 
Free software projects
Free statistical software
Functional languages
High-level programming languages
Homoiconic programming languages
Lisp programming language family
Multi-paradigm programming languages
Numerical analysis software for Linux
Numerical analysis software for macOS
Numerical analysis software for Windows
Numerical libraries 
Numerical linear algebra
Numerical programming languages
Object-oriented programming languages
Parallel computing
Procedural programming languages
Programming languages
Programming languages created in 2012

Software using the MIT license
Statistical programming languages
Text-oriented programming languages
Programming languages supporting units of measure